The Mindoro striped rat (Chrotomys mindorensis) is a species of rodent in the family Muridae.
It is found only in the Philippines.

References

Rats of Asia
Endemic fauna of the Philippines
Fauna of Mindoro
Rodents of the Philippines
Mammals described in 1945
Chrotomys
Taxonomy articles created by Polbot